Tilbhita railway station (code:TBB) is a small halt on the Sahibganj loop, that serves as a stone crushing unit, and a loading place. A few local trains have a stoppage here.

References

Railway stations in Pakur district
Howrah railway division